The XXI 2017 Pan Am Badminton Championships were held as two events in different counties. From 16 to 19 February, the team event was held in Santo Domingo, Dominican Republic. From 27 to 30 April, the individual event was held in Havana, Cuba.

Venue
The team event was held at Juan Pablo Duarte Olympic Center Volleyball Pavilion in the city of Santo Domingo, Dominican Republic.
The individual event was held at the Sports City Coliseum, in Havana, Cuba.

Medalists
In the team event, Canada national badminton team won the gold medal after beating Brazil national badminton team with the score 3–0 in the men's singles, women's singles and men's doubles events.

References

External links
Official website
TournamentSoftware.com: Individual Results
TournamentSoftware.com: Team Results

Pan Am Badminton Championships
Pan Am Badminton Championships
Badminton tournaments in the Dominican Republic
International sports competitions hosted by the Dominican Republic
Badminton tournaments in Cuba
International sports competitions hosted by Cuba